Polateli District is a district of Kilis Province of Turkey. Its seat is the town Polateli. It had a total population of 4,856 in 2022.

References

Districts of Kilis Province